Guru Harkrishan Public School, Patiala is a higher-secondary co-education private school in the Patiala city of Punjab, India. The school was founded in 2006 and is affiliated to the Central Board of Secondary Education of India.

References 

Co-educational schools in India
Educational institutions established in 2006
2006 establishments in Punjab, India